Ian G. Truran is the chief executive officer of Clarien Bank Limited. Truran was previously an executive with The Bank of N. T. Butterfield & Son Limited. He is a director and the treasurer of the International Charitable Foundation of Bermuda.

Truran has a Bachelor of Commerce degree from Dalhousie University (1992) and a Diploma of Graduation from the Stonier Graduate School of Banking and Wharton Leadership Certificate from The Wharton School (both 2013).

References 

Living people
Dalhousie University alumni
Year of birth missing (living people)
American bankers
American chief executives
Place of birth missing (living people)